This is a list of notable mosques in Bulgaria.

Ottoman Mosques

See also 
 Ottoman architecture
 Islam in Bulgaria
 List of former mosques in Greece
 List of mosques in Greece

References

 
Bulgaria
Mosques